Dongbei University of Finance & Economics (DUFE; ; Dongbei means Northeast) is a public university in Dalian, Liaoning province, Northeast China. Home to over 20,000 students, it is one of the oldest and largest modern universities in Dalian.

DUFE is a multidisciplinary, teaching-and-research-oriented university focused on economics, management, law, arts, and science. It offers full- and part-time education programs.

For full-time programs, DUFE offers three first-level mobile stations for post-doctoral research—applied economics, theoretical economics and business administration; 42 PhD programs, 72 master's degree programs, including MBA, MPA, MPAcc, J.M., etc. and 31 undergraduate programs. In all the disciplines, there are two key state-sponsored disciplines: industrial economics and public finance (including taxation); one key state-supported discipline: quantitative economics; and three state-level majors with their own characteristics: accounting, finance and business administration.

Major schools and departments 
Global Institute of Management and Economics (GIME)
 School of Public Finance and Taxation
 School of Law
 School of Business Administration (MBA Education Center)
 School of Public Administration
School of Management Science and Engineering (SMSE)
 College of International Economics & Trade
 School of International Business Communications
 International Business College
 School of International Education (International Students Office)
 Institute for Advanced Economic Research
 Higher Vocational and Technical College
 School of Finance
 School of Economics
 School of Accounting (MPAcc Education Center)
 School of Tourism and Hotel Management
 School of Marxism
 College of Humanities and Communication
 DUFE—Surrey International Institute
 School of Mathematics and Quantitative Economics
 School of Statistics
 School of Investment & Construction Management
 School of Continuing Education
 School of Distance Learning
 Innovation & Entrepreneurship Experimental Teaching Center

Admissions 

DUFE's students are from all 30 provinces in China, as well as international students from more than 30 countries. As one of the most competitive schools, DUFE's average China National College Entrance Exams grades are consistently among the top three in Liaoning province. The graduate employment rates are also one of the highest (over 95%).

International cooperation/programs

DUFE's International Education Center facilitates students' studies from international perspectives. Its participants at home are afforded the access to international perspectives. The international cooperation programs have grown to include 13 exchange programs with nine universities in six countries (the UK, Germany, Korea, Japan, Canada, Australia, Ireland and Austria). Some of the joint programs are:

 DUFE—Curtin University: 3+1 years Bachelors' program in Accounting
 DUFE—University of Western Ontario (Huron College): 2+2 years Bachelors' program in Economics
 DUFE—University of Western Ontario (King's University College): 2+2 years Bachelors' program in Finance & Business Administration
 DUFE—University of Mainz (Johannes Gutenberg Universität, Mainz): 3+3 years Bachelors + Masters' program in Economics
 DUFE—Ritsumeikan APU: 2+2 years Bachelors' program in Business Administration (Asia Pacific concentration)
 DUFE—Surrey International Institute offers masters and undergraduate exchange programs with University of Surrey, UK

Athletic programs 

DUFE prides itself on student athletes and collegiate sports. It is one of the national bases for collegiate sports development.

The men's soccer team has won four consecutive championships of China's collegiate men's soccer champions tournament — one-time champions and twice runners-up of “Phillips Cup” of China's men's soccer collegiate champions league, and Championship of Asia-Pacific University Men's soccer invitational. DUFE's men's basketball team had a strong force in the China University Basketball Association (CUBA), having won many city and provincial championships and third place in the national finals. DUFE's field and track team has been in overall second place Asia University Track and Field's Invitational, first place in the 9th China National University Field and Tracks Games.

DUFE's graduates include athletes and coaches of Olympic gold medalists, world champions/record holders, and many national champions.

Rankings and reputation 
DUFE is one of the top schools in the field in China, with its graduates occupying high-level positions in government and industries, especially in banking and finance sectors. It has a significant position throughout the northeast and across the country. As of 2022, Dongbei University of Finance & Economics ranked # 1 in Northeast China region and # 6 nationwide among universities specialized in finance, business, and economics in the Best Chinese Universities Ranking. Dongbei University of Finance & Economics ranked amongst the top # 400 universities in the world for "Management" and "Hospitality & Tourism Management".

Notable alumni 

 Chen Zhenggao: Governor, Liaoning Province
 Dong Dasheng: Deputy Director, National Audit Bureau
 Li Wancai: Mayor of Dalian
 Zheng Zhijie: President, China National Development Bank
 Liu Kegu: Vice President, China National Development Bank
 Lu Xin: Deputy Minister, Ministry of Education of China
 Ma Yongwei: Former Chairman, China Insurance Regulatory Commission
 Meng Jianmin: Deputy Director, State Assets Supervision and Administration Commission
 Tang Shuangnin: Chairman, China Everbright Banking Group
 Wang Hongzhang: Chairman, China Construction Banking Group
 Wang Wenyuan: Former Vice Chairman, Chinese People's Political Consultative Conference
 Wang Xianzhang: Chairman, China Insurance Society, Former Chairman/CEO, China Life Insurance Group
 Xia Deren: Deputy Party Secretary, Liaoning Province (Former President of Dongbei University of Finance & Economics and Mayor of Dalian)
 Xie Xuezhi: Deputy Director, National Tax Authority
 Yao Zhongmin: Vice President, China National Development Bank	
 Zhou Yanli: Vice Chairman, China Insurance Regulatory Commission
 Zhuang Xinyi: Vice Chairman, China Securities Regulatory Commission

See also
 Dongbei University of Finance and Economics Press

References

External links
 Dongbei University of Finance & Economics

 
Educational institutions established in 1952
1952 establishments in China